International Musician and Recording World was a magazine published from 1975 to 1991. Originally launched in the UK, editions were created for the United States, Europe, Australia, and Japan.

Foundation
International Musician and Recording World was created by Ray Hammond, Richard Desmond, and Malcolm Green. The title was published by Cover Publications Ltd, which the trio incorporated in London in 1974. Desmond and Hammond had previously worked together at Beat Instrumental, while Green was a former managing director at HH Electronic and joint proprietor of White Rabbit Records with Desmond. Cover Publications would later become Northern & Shell.

Expansion 
The first issue of International Musician and Recording World was published in the UK in March 1975, with the team working out of Bayham Street in Camden, London, later moving to Drury Lane c1978. An American edition launched later that year, with Julius and Gary Graifman acting as General Manager and Editor, respectively, in the New York office. Steven Dupler would later take over as Editor-in-Chief of the US edition in the 1980s.

The German edition was launched in 1979, with Wolfgang Bongertz—formerly of Spotlight magazine—acting as Editor-in-Chief. After initially starting production in Frankfurt, the German team was moved to the Drury Lane office within a few months. After the German edition was discontinued, members of staff would go on to set up Soundcheck magazine.

Content 
International Musician and Recording World contained interviews with well-known recording artists, such as George Harrison, George Benson, Jaco Pastorius, and Frank Zappa. It also featured advice on recording techniques and reviews of musical equipment. Content was shared between the editions, with the German team translating an interview with Kraftwerk for the English edition, for instance.

Editors

Ray Hammond, Jeff Pike, Tony Horkins, Tony Reed, Matt Wallis.

Advertising

Partnership dissolves

References 

Music magazines published in the United Kingdom
Defunct magazines published in the United Kingdom
Magazines established in 1974
Magazines disestablished in 1991
Professional and trade magazines
Magazines published in London
Monthly magazines published in the United Kingdom